Star Crystal is a 1986 science fiction film directed by Lance Lindsay. The film stars C. Juston Campbell and Faye Bolt as a pair of astronauts who must survive against a mysterious alien lifeform seeking to kill them, while also facing dwindling supplies aboard their damaged shuttlecraft.

Plot
In 2032, a crewed expedition to Mars discovers a mysterious egg buried under the planet's surface and brings it to their ship, the SC-37. While the astronauts are away, the egg hatches, releasing a crystal and a slimy alien creature that hides on the ship. The astronauts conduct experiments on the crystal and the alien, and are soon killed when their air supply is shut off.

Two months later, the SC-37 is intercepted by the space station L-5, which subsequently is destroyed by a malfunctioning neutron reactor. A small, ragtag survey crew escape aboard the damaged ship, and the dire situation forces them to work together despite their differences. The crew of five conclude that they lack the supplies necessary to return to Earth or await rescue, and decide to stop at a pair of supply stations to remedy this. Meanwhile, the alien hides in the engine room and quickly begins killing the crew. Soon, only two, Roger Campbell and Dr. Adrian Kimberly, remain. As Roger and Adrian lock the alien out of the bridge, it retreats back to the engine room with the crystal. Roger and Adrian find data in the ship's computer, Bernice, indicating that the alien rapidly matures and grows in intelligence, while the crystal is an advanced computer the alien uses when confronted with a problem. Using the crystal, the alien hacks into and takes control of the ship, cutting off their communications and tricking another nearby ship into believing SC-37 does not require rescue. During a subsequent meteor storm that endangers the ship, the alien uses the crystal to project a force field until the storm passes. Roger is forced to enter the engine room to retrieve a crate of rations, but when he leaves without threatening the alien, it lets him go. Soon after, the alien begins reading data on the evolution of the human race and a Bible stored in Bernice's memory.

Roger and Adrian decide to continue on to the first supply station, Alpha-7, but Bernice informs them that they will need to repair the engine for this to be feasible. Realizing they must confront the alien, they go the engine room, where it reveals itself to them. Much to their shock, it apologizes profusely for its actions, claiming that it was killing in self defense until realizing that humans were not as dangerous as it first thought. Identifying itself as GAR, it surrenders control of the ship back to Roger and Adrian, who forgive it and strike a bargain: after they reach the safety of Alpha-7, they will give SC-37 to GAR so it can return to its home planet. The trio work together and repair the ship, quickly forming a friendship with each other despite their initial conflict.

SC-37 docks at Alpha-7, and Roger helps GAR load rations in preparation for its voyage. However, a gravity tunnel soon opens; this anomaly can help Roger and Adrian return to Earth, but they must immediately depart aboard the SC-37 to make the trip. GAR realizes that it must part ways with the humans and thanks them, saying that it will always cherish their brief time as friends. Bidding them a sad farewell, GAR uses the crystal to convert Alpha-7 into a ship and sets off for its planet, while Roger and Adrian finally make it back to Earth.

Cast
 C. Juston Campbell as Roger Campbell
 Faye Bolt as Dr. Adrian Kimberly
 John W. Smith as Cal
 Taylor Kingsley as Sherrie Stevens
 Marcia Linn as Lt. Billi Lynn
 The Gling as the voice of GAR

Music
The film's score was composed by Doug Katsaros. The song featured in its end credits, "Crystal of a Star," was written by Katsaros with lyrics and vocals by Stefani Christopherson.

DVD release
On June 24, 2003 Star Crystal was released for the first time on DVD in Widescreen by Anchor Bay Entertainment. Kino Lorber later issued it on DVD and Blu-ray on July 11, 2017.

See also
 List of films featuring space stations
 List of films set on Mars

Footnotes

External links

 
Review on BadMovies.org

1980s science fiction horror films
Films about astronauts
Films set in 2032
Films set on spacecraft
Mars in film
Films set in the future
1980s monster movies
American space adventure films
New World Pictures films
1980s English-language films
1980s American films